Boice is a surname. Notable people with the name include:

 Griffin Boice, American producer and songwriter
 James Boice (writer), American writer
 James Montgomery Boice, theologian and pastor

See also
Boyce (surname)